Zunyi Bridge is a  bridge in Wujiangzhen, Zunyi County, Guizhou, China. The bridge forms part of China National Highway 210 between Zunyi and Guiyang. The bridge was opened in 1997 and spans  over the Wu River. The design is an unusual hybrid of both cable-stayed and suspension bridges.

See also
Wujiang Viaduct

External links
https://web.archive.org/web/20121015132607/http://highestbridges.com/wiki/index.php?title=Wujiang_River_Viaduct

Suspension bridges in China
Cable-stayed bridges in China
Bridges in Guizhou
Bridges completed in 1997